Kiara may refer to:


People
 Kiara (given name), includes a list of people with the given name
 Saint Cera (died 679), also spelled Kiara, a 7th-century Irish Roman Catholic saint
 Kiara (drag queen), stage name of Canadian drag entertainer Dimitri Nana-Côté

Music
 Kiara (singer), stage name of Venezuelan singer, actress, and TV presenter Gloria Delgado (born 1962)
 Kiiara (born 1995), stage name of American singer Kiara Saulters (born 1995)
 Kiara, an American R&B group known for the 1988 song "This Time"
 "Kiara", a song from the 2010 Bonobo album Black Sands

Other uses
 Kiara, Western Australia, a suburb of Perth, Australia
 Kiara (building), a high-rise building in Seattle, Washington, United States
 Kiara (The Lion King), a fictional lion in The Lion King II: Simba's Pride
 Princess Kiara, a main character in Super K – The Movie, a 2011 Indian animated film

See also 
 Kyara (disambiguation)
 Ciara (disambiguation)